The Brisbane River cod was a unique form of Maccullochella cod that occurred naturally in the Brisbane River system, an east coast river system in south east Queensland, Australia. The Brisbane River Cod was known as the Bumgur (meaning blue cod) by the Jinibara people centred in the Kilcoy region and the junction of the Stanley and Brisbane Rivers. Their exact taxonomic status is not known, but based on several genetic studies it is suspected that Brisbane River Cod were a species intermediate between eastern freshwater cod (Maccullochella ikei) of the Clarence River and Richmond River systems in northern New South Wales and Mary River cod of the Mary River in central Queensland.

All naturally occurring Maccullochella cod in east coast drainages ultimately originate from Murray cod, Maccullochella peelii that entered an east coast river system, likely the Clarence, via a natural river capture event somewhere between 0.62 and 1.62 million years ago (mean estimate 1.1 million years ago), as estimated by DNA divergence rates.

Brisbane River cod are extinct, from overfishing, habitat destruction and siltation, and whole-of-catchment scale bushfires and ash fish kills in the 1930s.

The Brisbane River has now been restocked with Mary River cod from the Mary River system.

References

 Anon. (2004). New South Wales Eastern (Freshwater) Cod (Maccullochella ikei) Recovery Plan. New South Wales Department of Fisheries, Port Nelson, New South Wales, Australia.
 Bearlin, A.R. and Tikel, D. (2002) Conservation genetics of Murray-Darling Basin fish: Silver perch (Bidyanus bidyanus), Murray cod (Maccullochella peelii), and Trout cod (M. macquariensis). In: Managing Fish Translocation and Stocking in the Murray-Darling Basin (workshop proceedings), Canberra, 25–26 September 2002. World Wildlife Fund, Sydney.
 Jerry, D.R., Elphinstone, M.S and Baverstock, P.R. (2001) Phylogenetic Relationships of Australian Members of the Family Percichthyidae Inferred from Mitochondrial 12S rRNA Sequence Data. Molecular Phylogenetics and Evolution 18: 335–347.
 Nock C.J., Elphinstone M.S., Rowland S.J. and Baverstock, P.R. (2010). Phylogenetics and revised taxonomy of the Australian freshwater cod genus, Maccullochella (Percichthyidae). Marine and Freshwater Research 61: 980–991.
 Rowland, S.J. (1993) Maccullochella ikei, an endangered species of freshwater cod (Pisces: Percichthyidae) from the Clarence River System, NSW, and M. peelii mariensis, a new subspecies from the Mary River System, QLD. Records of the Australian Museum 45: 121–145.

Percichthyidae
Brisbane River
Undescribed vertebrate species
Fish extinctions since 1500